Nise Hitomi Yamaguchi (Maringá, May 6, 1959) is a Brazilian physician with the American ECFMG-ES tests and a well-known scientific researcher with a doctorate in clinical medicine with an oncologic study She has a master's degree in immunology and is an international speaker for health issues. Her area of research is personalized medicine and translational research in oncology and immunology, and utilizes the knowledge of genetics, epigenetics, omics to understand and treat many diseases, including cancer and immunological diseases. She is not affiliated to any political party nowadays.

Professional career
She graduated in medicine from the Faculty of Medicine of the University of São Paulo in 1982, and completed her residency in clinical medicine in immunology and allergies at the Hospital das Clínicas da Universidade de São Paulo (HCFMUSP) in 1988.

During her studies, she took courses in Germany and Switzerland on the humanistic view of patients and their families. She also participated in training in New York City with scientists at the Memorial Sloan Kettering Cancer Center, where she studied aspects of tumor immunology, which resulted in her master's thesis defended in the discipline of immunology at HCFMUSP, in 1993. Her doctorate thesis was made in conjunction with translational labs at the MD Anderson Cancer Center in Houston, United States. She is board certified for clinical oncology and immunology by the Brazilian Medical Association and in Oncology by the European Society of Medical Oncology.

Recognition
She became known internationally for her strong activity to approve the WHO-supported Framework Convention for Tobacco Control, that ended up in the Brazilian ratification and indoors tobacco free environment and many other regulations that prevent cancer and protect people of non-communicable chronic degenerative diseases. She participated in international forums for tobacco cessation with members of the European Parliament in Austria, in conferences in Japan, Australia, United States, Peru, Chile, Panama, Mexico, Argentina, Uruguay, etc., and has given talks about personalized medicine in Lyon, France, Prague, Tcheck Republic, Latin America, and about PPP (public–private partnership) in the World Bank conference for Asian countries in the Philippines and at the David Rockfeller Center for Latin American Studies at Harvard campus, in Boston, United States. During the COVID-19 pandemic, Dr. Yamaguchi, as an immunologist with previous experience in public health, has participated in many conferences about diagnosis, early treatments and vaccines, and became nationally well known for being quoted to succeed the then Minister of Health Luiz Henrique Mandetta and for defending support measures and early treatments for COVID-19. She has always denied that would be indicated for the position, although there was always some speculation by the media around her name, every time there would be a change at the Health Ministery. Dr. Yamaguchi has served in different governments during the last 25 years of different political backgrounds, addressing the diversity, equality, inclusion at the prevention and health quality of life issues, with a strong commitment to the access to right and timely basis treatments, especially in cancer and non-communicable chronic diseases for low- and middle-income populations throughout the world. She is also devoted to the issue of governance in public affairs and works as a volunteer with a group led by Dr. Nelson Teich, that she helped create, about governance in health provision by the public and private domains.

Dr. Nise Yamaguchi works for the international public health and during her 40 years in medicine taking care of more than 15,000 patients, has been working for the tobacco control in the world, leading several new regulations for a tobacco-free environment and organizing tobacco control forums. She has worked together with health ministeries from different governments for the access of good treatments and prevention in the area of cancer. During AIDS and H1N1 epidemics, she served as immunologist and clinical advisor to different governments. She participated in many hearings at the Senate and Brazilian congress, as well, always as a volunteer, representing cancer and patient's organizations, and also, the civil organized society.

Her current work is as a clinician, director of the Institute of Advances in Medicine in Brazil, and as a physician, takes care of her patients in different hospitals, including the Hospital Albert Einstein, where she belongs to the open clinical body of the hospital . Dr. Nise Yamaguchi also sees patients in the hospital Sirio Libanes, Beneficiencia Portuguesa in São Paulo, among others. She has received open support of physicians like Dr. Wladimir Zelenko from New York, and also, from the Israel Brazil Community, that has given her an award in Minas Gerais, with the Priest Jane Silva. 
Her carrier brought several awards, like the recognition of the Brazilian Cancer Institute for her activities against Tobacco, the Jimmie Holland Award by the Brazilian Society of Psycho-Oncology, The Joseph Cullen Award from the International Association for Lung Cancer Studies, the Mario Kroeff Medal from the Brazilian Cancer Society, the lifelong achievements recognition by the World Prevention Alliance in Lyon and International Prevention and Research Institute, among others. Dr. Nise Yamaguchi has written a book named" The Human being facing cancer and the will to cure", that has received one indication for the Jabuti prize and is at the second edition by UNESP editors. She participated in the organization of two books by the International Prevention and Research Institute (World Cancer and Breast Cancer) and has one book about to be printed about integrative and molecular oncology. Her field of interest is bringing new treatments and discussing access to middle- and low-income countries, especially in Latin America. Works for the governance of different levels of the society.

References

Bibliography

External links 
 Currículo Lattes

Living people
20th-century women
21st-century women
1959 births
Brazilian people of Japanese descent
Brazilian women physicians
Brazilian immunologists
Brazilian women scientists
COVID-19 pandemic in Brazil
People from Maringá
Republican Party of the Social Order politicians
Brazilian Labour Party (current) politicians